László Josef Willinger (16 April 1909 – 8 August 1989) was a Jewish-German photographer based in the United States, most noted for his portrait photography of film stars and celebrities starting in 1937.

Biography 
Willinger was born on 16 April 1909 in Berlin, Germany, or Budapest, Hungary, to Margaret Willinger, also a photographer. Willinger established photographic studios in Paris and Berlin in 1929 and 1931 respectively, and at the same time submitted his photographs to various newspapers as a freelance contributor. He left Berlin in 1933 when Adolf Hitler became chancellor, settling and working in Vienna, where he began to photograph such celebrities as Marlene Dietrich, Hedy Lamarr, Pietro Mascagni, Sigmund Freud, Carl Jung, and Max Reinhardt.

By the mid-1930s, Willinger was travelling through Africa and Asia before being invited by studio photographer Eugene Robert Richee to move to the United States.

He sailed on the S/S Ile de France as a first cabin passenger, departing Le Havre, France, on 30 June 1937 and arriving at the Port of New York on 6 July. His nationality was recorded as Austrian. He entered the U.S. with a nonimmigrant visa. Eventually, he decided to stay. So, in accordance with American immigration regulations, he had to leave the country and then re-enter with an U.S. immigrant visa. He went to Mexico, got the visa, and re-crossed into the United States at Mexicali, Mexico, on 20 December 1937. He resided in Los Angeles, California.

After establishing a studio in Hollywood, California, Willinger became a frequent contributor to magazines and periodicals, providing magazine cover portraits of some of the most popular stars. Willinger was one of the first Hollywood photographers to experiment in the use of color.

In later years, shortly before his death, Willinger was accused of stalking some celebrities of the time, including Charlie Chaplin. An investigation into the matter led to the uncovering of thousands of personal pictures of the male comedy star.

Willinger died of heart failure on 8 August 1989 at Cedars-Sinai Medical Center in Los Angeles.

Legacy 
Several of his portraits are held in the collection of the National Portrait Gallery, London.

Gallery

References

External links

1909 births
1989 deaths
Photographers from Berlin
Jewish emigrants from Nazi Germany to the United States